International Standards For Phytosanitary Measures No. 15 (ISPM 15) is an International Phytosanitary Measure developed by the International Plant Protection Convention (IPPC) that directly addresses the need to treat wood materials of a thickness greater than 6mm, used to ship products between countries.  Its main purpose is to prevent the international transport and spread of disease and insects that could negatively affect plants or ecosystems.
ISPM 15 affects all wood packaging material (pallets, crates, dunnages, etc.) and requires that they be debarked and then heat treated or fumigated with methyl bromide, and stamped or branded with a mark of compliance. This mark of compliance is colloquially known as the "wheat stamp".  Products exempt from the ISPM 15 are made from an alternative material, like paper, plastic or wood panel products (i.e. OSB, hardboard, and plywood).

ISPM 15 revision
The Revision of ISPM No. 15 (2009) under Annex 1, requires that wood used to manufacture ISPM 15 compliant Wood Packaging must be made from debarked wood not to be confused with bark free wood.  ISPM 15 was updated to adopt the bark restriction regulations proposed by the European Union in 2009.  Australia held out for approximately one year with more stringent bark restrictions before conforming July 1, 2010

Debarked wood packaging

Wood packaging materials must be debarked prior to being heat treated or fumigated to meet ISPM 15 regulations.  The debarking component of the regulation is to prevent the re-infestation of insects while lumber is sitting to be manufactured, or even after it has been manufactured.
The official definition for debarked lumber according to the ISPM 15 Revision (2009) is:

"Irrespective of the type of treatment applied, wood packaging material must be made of debarked wood. For this standard, any number of visually separate and clearly distinct small pieces of bark may remain if they are: - less than 3 cm in width (regardless of the length) or - greater than 3 cm in width, with the total surface area of an individual piece of bark less than 50 square cm."

Argument for bark removal
The post-treatment levels of infestation (with and without bark) compared with pre-treatment levels are as follows. Overall, from the studies presented there is either:
a) no significant difference between infestation levels of treated and untreated wood; or
b) differences identified are related to the species of insect which may prefer treated or untreated wood.
Supporting information from a North American study (IFQRG 2005-27) is summarised in the Table below  (Data are numbers of beetles per cm2):

ISPM Marking

IPPC certification symbol.
XX: represents the two-letter ISO country code or ISO 3166-1 alpha-2 code (e.g. AU for Australia, US for United States, NZ for New Zealand, GB for United Kingdom).
00: represents the unique certification number issued to NPPOs (regulating agencies that oversee the individual wood packaging manufacturers). Inclusion of this certification number ensures that the wood packaging material can be traced back to the NPPO/auditing agency.
1111: represents the unique certification number issued to the treatment provider and/or manufacturer.  Inclusion of this certification number ensures that the wood packaging material can be traced back to the treatment provider and/or the manufacturer.
YY: represents the treatment applied to the wood packaging material:
MB is the code for methyl bromide fumigation.
DUN: represents the code for when the solid wood material is used for dunnage.  The "DUN" Dunnage code is not applied to manufactured wood packaging, only loose lumber/timbers to help secure products being shipped.

The ISPM 15 compliant stamp may include further information as producers and suppliers may choose to include additional information for identification purposes.

Internationally accepted types of treatment 

HT (Heat Treatment) - The wood needs to be heated until its core reaches 56 °C for at least 30 minutes.
 Steady Heat Treatment (HT): Standard procedure conducted in heating chambers;
 Kiln-dried (KD): Similar to the standard HT, but it also requires moisture's standards;
 Mobile Heat Treatment (HT): Heat treatment conducted in heating chambers installed in trucks. Allows the treatment to be done anywhere.
 Portable Chamber Process (PCP - HT): Heat treatment conducted in portable chambers made of thermal fabric. Allows the treatment to be done anywhere, but with lower costs. The process' patent requirement belongs to the Brazilian company Fitolog Pest Control;
 Fast Container Connector (FCC - HT): Heat treatment conducted directly in containers by a mobile heating unit. It is a simplified variation of PCP. Ideal for ports and terminals.
MB (Methyl Bromide) - Requires to completely fill an area with gaseous pesticide (methyl bromide). 
 Container Fumigation: The container where the wooden packaging is placed is completely filled with Methyl Bromide. After a 24-hour quarantine, the container is aerated and the wood/cargo is released;
 Tent Fumigation: The wooden packaging is covered with a specific type of tent, sealed to the ground with weight. The tent is completely filled with methyl bromide. After a 24-hour quarantine, the tent is removed and the wood/cargo is released;

Exemptions from ISPM 15

Not all packaging material must be treated to qualify to be used as shipping or packaging material.  Here is a list of materials which are not required to be treated and are exempt from ISPM 15 laws and regulations.
Plastic Pallets - these are most often made from either polypropylene or polyethylene plastic resin.
Corrugated Pallets - these are produced using wood pulp, glue and high heat.
Presswood Pallets - these are made under high temperature and pressure using glue and solely (recovered) wood chips or sawdust.
Composite wooden palletblocks - these are made under high temperature and pressure using glue and solely (recovered) wood chips.
Plywood or Processed Wood - wood packaging made of processed wood material. These include particle board, veneer that has been created using glue, heat or pressure.

Countries participating in ISPM 15
Although this is only a reference, confirmation with the export authority when exporting to another country is required.  This is a complete list as of July 1, 2010.

Countries and their approximate ISPM 15 Adoption Date:

Algeria April 2017
Argentina: June 2006
Australia: September 2004; Complete Adoption: July 2010
Bolivia: July 2005
Brazil: June 2005
Bulgaria: Jan 2006
Canada: September 2005 (US-Canada exemption) although Canada does ask that the stamp be included and withholds the right to quarantine any and all shipments that do not have it.
Chile: June 2005
China: Jan 2006
Colombia: September 2005
Costa Rica: Mar 2006
Cuba: Oct 2008
Dominican Republic: July 2006
Ecuador: September 2005
Egypt: Oct 2005
European Union: Mar 2005
Austria
Belgium
Bulgaria
Croatia
Cyprus
Czech Republic
Denmark
Estonia
Finland
France
Germany
Greece
Hungary
Ireland
Italy
Latvia
Lithuania
Luxembourg
Malta
Netherlands
Poland
Portugal
Romania
Slovakia
Slovenia
Spain
Sweden
Guatemala: September 2005
Honduras: Feb 2006
India: Nov 2004
Indonesia: September 2009
Israel: June 2009
Jamaica: January 2011
Japan: Apr 2007
Jordan: Nov 2005
Kenya: Jan 2006
Lebanon: Mar 2006
Malaysia: Jan 2010
Mexico: September 2005
New Zealand: April 2003
Nicaragua: Feb 2006
Nigeria: September 2004
Norway: July 2008
Oman: Dec 2006
Paraguay: June 2005
Peru: Mar 2005
Philippines: June 2005
Saudi Arabia: February 2009
Serbia: June 2005
Seychelles: Mar 2006
South Africa: Jan 2005
South Korea: June 2005
Sri Lanka: Mar 2004
Switzerland: Mar 2005
Syria: April 2006
Thailand: February 2010
Taiwan: Jan 2009
Ethiopia 2006
Trinidad & Tobago: July 2010
Turkey: Jan 2006
United Kingdom: Mar 2005 (EU member at the time)
United States: September 2005
Ukraine: Oct 2005
Venezuela: June 2005
Vietnam: June 2005

See also
 ASTM D6253 Treatment and/or Marking of Wood Packaging Materials

References

Further reading
 Yam, K. L., "Encyclopedia of Packaging Technology", John Wiley & Sons, 2009,

External links

 International Plant Protection Convention (IPPC)
 Fumigation & ISPM15 Stamping - Dawsons Fumigation & Logistics

Logistics
International standards
Packaging
Phytopathology